Padma Narayan Chaudhary (Tharu) (born 1948) is a Nepali politician and a member of the House of Representatives of the Federal parliament of Nepal. He was elected from Nepali Congress under the proportional representation system. Following his election to parliament, he was appointed the coordinator for the Ministry of Agriculture and Livestock in the shadow cabinet of the main opposition Nepali Congress.

In the 2013 Constituent Assembly election, he was elected from Siraha-1 constituency under the first-past-the-post system. He had previously won the 1991 and 1994 parliamentary elections from the same constituency but lost in the 1999 and 2008 elections.

References

Living people
1948 births
Place of birth missing (living people)
21st-century Nepalese people
People from Siraha District
Nepali Congress politicians from Madhesh Province
Nepal MPs 2017–2022
Nepal MPs 1991–1994
Nepal MPs 1994–1999
Members of the 2nd Nepalese Constituent Assembly